Pultenaea weindorferi, commonly known as swamp bush-pea, is a species of flowering plant in the family Fabaceae and is endemic to Victoria, Australia. It is a slender, erect shrub with linear to narrow egg-shaped leaves and uniformly yellow, pea-like flowers.

Description
The flowers are arranged in clusters of more than six at the ends of the branches with floral leaves with enlarged stipules at the base. Flowering occurs from October to November.

Taxonomy and naming
Pultenaea weindorferi was first formally described in 1905 by Felix Reader in The Victorian Naturalist from specimens collected in a swamp near Wandin 1903 by Gustav Weindorfer. The specific epithet (weindorferi) honours the collector of the type specimens.

A 2002 paper has proposed that the name of this species is a synonym of Pultenaea glabra.

Distribution
Swamp bush-pea grows in swamps and moist places in scattered places in southern Victoria, including near Tonimbuk, Daylesford and Kinglake.

References

weindorferi
Flora of Victoria (Australia)
Plants described in 1905